Stefan Stanković ((Sremski Karlovci, Austrian Empire, 24 June 1788 - Sremski Karlovci, Austrian Empire, 31 July 1841) was a Serbian Orthodox bishop from the Eparchy of Budaand Metropolitan of Karlovci from 1836 to 1841, succeeding Stefan Stratimirović. He was succeeded by Metropolitan Josif Rajačić.

Biography
He was born in Sremski Karlovci to parents Stojko and Pelagija. He completed his high school education in Sremski Karlovci and the Faculty of Philosophy at the University of Pest. In 1807 Metropolitan Stefan Stratimirović appointed him professor in Karlovci. He was ordained deacon on December 25, 1808, by the Bishop Josif Putnik of the Eparchy of Pakrac. Bishop Josif (Putnik) was sympathetic to Stanković and helped him move ahead. Josif took him with him to Croatia, to Pakrac where he received the bishop's throne. He was promoted to the rank of Protodeacon on August 15, 1809, at Lepavina Monastery. He went to the Rakovac monastery where he was initiated in the act of small schima. He was tonsured by the head of the monastery Archimandrite Prokopije Bolić. He was promoted to the rank of Archimandrite of Orahovac on July 13, 1819. 

He was elected bishop of Buda at a consecration ceremony in Sremski Karlovci on January 20, 1829, presided by Metropolitan Stefan Stratimirović with the bishops of Timișoara Josif and Gideon of Bačka. In his honour, Adam Dragosavljević wrote an ode in 1829 that was the second book published in Vuk Karadžić's reformed language. Prota Stamatović dedicated his almanac Serbska pčela ("The Serbian Bee") to Metropolitan Stefan (Stanković), initiated in 1830.He was appointed Bishop of Bačka on September 30, 1834.He loved playing bagpipes.

After the death of Stefan Stratimirović, he was elected Metropolitan of Karlovac on November 23, 1837. During his reign as Metropolitan, he provided scholarships for 12 young men, including the painter Dimitrije Avramović. He died in Sremski Karlovci in 1841, where he was buried in the Cathedral Church.

See also
 Metropolitanate of Karlovci
 List of heads of the Serbian Orthodox Church

External links 
 Stefan Stanković

References 

Metropolitans of Karlovci
Bishops of Bačka
19th-century Serbian people